Patricia L. Acampora (born December 10, 1945) was appointed as a Commissioner of the New York Public Service Commission (PSC) on June 16, 2005, by Gov. George Pataki, for a term ending February 1, 2009. In December 2006, Pataki named Acampora to Chair the PSC, a position she held until January 2008, when Gov. Eliot Spitzer appointed Garry A. Brown as chairman.

On February 9, 2009, Governor David A. Paterson announced the reappointment Acampora as a Commissioner of the PSC, pending confirmation by the New York State Senate. Her new term expired on February 1, 2015, and her salary as a Commissioner was at $109,800.

Acampora had previously served in the New York State Assembly for 12 years (1993 to 2005), representing the 1st Assembly District on Long Island. As an Assemblywoman, she was a Ranking Member of the Labor Committee; a member of the Consumer Affairs and Protection Committee; the Corporations, Authorities, and Commissions Committee; Banking Committee; and the Governmental Employees Committee.

From 1990 to 1993, Acampora worked as an assistant to the Suffolk County Executive. From 1989 to 1993, she also worked as an assistant to former State Assemblyman Joseph Sawicki Jr. She is a former member of the Nassau-Suffolk Juvenile Diabetes Board, and is currently a member of the East End Women's Network and the Capital Network Women's Group.

Acampora was raised and educated on Long Island, graduating from New Field High School in 1963 and attending Dowling College. She resides in Mattituck, New York, with her husband, Alan Croce. Acampora has two grown daughters, two stepdaughters, and four grandchildren.

Election results
 November 1998 general election, NYS Assembly, 1st AD
{| class="Wikitable"
| Patricia L. Acampora (REP - IND - CON - RTL) || ... || 26,100
|-
| Michael A. D'Arrigo (DEM) || ... || 10,665
|}

 November 2000 general election, NYS Assembly, 1st AD
{| class="Wikitable"
| Patricia L. Acampora (REP - IND - CON) || ... || 37,347
|-
| Joseph A. Turdik (DEM) || ... || 14,705
|}

 November 2002 general election, NYS Assembly, 1st AD
{| class="Wikitable"
| Patricia L. Acampora (REP - IND - CON - WOR) || ... || 28,895
|-
| Darren Johnson (DEM - LIB - GRE) || ... || 9,453
|-
| Barbara Keenan (RTL) || ... || 991
|}

 November 2004 general election, NYS Assembly, 1st AD
{| class="Wikitable"
| Patricia L. Acampora (REP - IND - CON - WOR) || ... || 42,997
|-
| James McManmon (DEM) || ... || 19,630
|}

References

1945 births
Living people
Republican Party members of the New York State Assembly
People from Mattituck, New York
People from Waukegan, Illinois
State cabinet secretaries of New York (state)
Women state legislators in New York (state)
20th-century American politicians
20th-century American women politicians
21st-century American politicians
21st-century American women politicians
Dowling College alumni